Pawan Kumar Drall (born 12 May 1995) is an Indian professional footballer who plays as a defender for I-League club Gokulam Kerala.

Career
A product of AIFF Academy, Kumar made his professional debut for Salgaocar on 28 December 2014 against Bengaluru FC in the Federation Cup. He started the match as Salgaocar lost 2–3. He also started in his second match in federation cup which they won 2-1 against shillong lajong. On August 23, 2021, Gokulam Kerala FC announced that he has signed for them on a two-year deal.

International
Kumar has represented the India U19 side.

Career statistics

Club

Honours
Real Kashmir
IFA Shield: 2020

Gokulam Kerala
 I-League: 2021–22

References

1995 births
Living people
Indian footballers
Footballers from Delhi
Salgaocar FC players
I-League players
Association football defenders
India youth international footballers
AIFF Elite Academy players
I-League 2nd Division players
Indian Super League players
FC Pune City players
NorthEast United FC players
Real Kashmir FC players
Gokulam Kerala FC players